The Detroit Business Institute (previously known as Detroit Business University and Goldsmith, Bryant & Stratton Business College) is an educational institute focusing on medical training founded in Detroit, Michigan.  The school has held several campuses but is now located in Riverview, Michigan.

History
The antecedent school, the Goldsmith Business College, was founded by W. D. Cochrane and located at the corner of Larned and Woodward Avenue about four blocks north of the Detroit River. In 1857 Cochrane sold the school to Bryant and Stratton, who moved it to the Merrill Block where J. H. Goldsmith managed the institution as a branch of Bryant & Stratton College. When the Detroit Business University was formed Goldsmith was its first president. In 1874 the institution moved to the corner of Griswold Street and Lafayette Avenue.

Spencerian Business College was a successor of the Mayhew Business College that had operated in Albion, Michigan beginning in 1859

The Detroit Business University was founded in 1887 by the merger of Spencerian Business College (founded in 1883) and Goldsmith Business College (founded in 1850). One of its early presidents was William F. Jewell, while Platt R. Spencer, who had headed the Spencerian Business College, was the head of the school's penmanship department.

Among the students who studied at institutions that became the Detroit Business University was Henry Ford.

The Gutchess Metropolitan Business College also later merged with the Detroit Business University.

In the 1930s the institution was still known as the Detroit Business University, but apparently by the 1950s it had changed its name to the Detroit Business Institute.

In the 1960s it began a collegiate institute in Dearborn, Michigan. In 1964 this became the Detroit College of Business. In the 2000s, the school had a campus in Southfield, Michigan, but that location has since closed. Now the school has one main campus, located in Riverview, Michigan.

Academics
The school offers the following programs:
 Medical Assistant
 Practical Nurse
 Medical Office

DBI was formerly accredited as a non-degree-granting institution approved to grant diplomas and certificates by the Accrediting Council for Independent Colleges and Schools. It is now accredited by the Accrediting Commission of Career Schools and Colleges. Additionally, the Practical Nurse program is approved by the Michigan Board of Nursing.

Notable alumni
Albert Cobo, former mayor of Detroit
Frank G. Dionesopulos, politician
Walter J. Domach, politician
Henry Ford, industrialist, philanthropist
John Lesinski, Sr., politician
Sidney Cecil Robinson, Canadian politician
Fred W. Springer, politician

References

External links
 Official website

Educational institutions established in 1887
History of Detroit
Private universities and colleges in Michigan
Universities and colleges in Wayne County, Michigan
Metro Detroit
Colleges accredited by the Accrediting Council for Independent Colleges and Schools
Nursing schools in Michigan
1887 establishments in Michigan